is a psychological action thriller manga by Jiro Matsumoto. It was originally published by Shogakukan in the seinen manga magazine Monthly Ikki between September 2001 and August 2009. It was adapted into a live-action film in February 2007.

Plot
In alternate history Japan is engaged in protracted war and massive economic recession. Due to massive military spending, many prisons are shut and a Vengeance Act is created instead to allow those who have been hurt by convicted criminals to get revenge. Various Vengeance Proxy Enforcer firms are created to supply the massive demand for these.

Characters

A mentally unstable ex-military assassin currently working as a Vengeance Proxy at a Proxy firm in alternate history Japan. He lives with his catatonic mother and girlfriend in a small apartment. Due to his training in the military, he possesses some kind of active camouflage that not only enables him to fade away at a moment's notice, leaving his coworkers confused, but allows bullets to pass through without injuring him. It is later revealed that he is able to alter people's senses to a certain extent, making him appear to be where he is not. At the beginning of the story he only seems to be slightly bizarre, but as the story goes on, it becomes more evident that he's well on his way to having a mental breakdown, such as beginning to copy what people say on television in his conversations. Other such events involve Kanō constantly hearing a telephone ringing, or a clock ticking and seeing and talking to people who are dead.

A proxy working at the same firm as Kanō, although he has been there much longer than his coworkers. He is constantly trying to hunt his coworkers, most notably Kanō, who weirds him out due to his bizarre abilities. Mizoguchi's ideology is that there are two kinds of people, lions and zebras. To him it is important that he hunts the zebras that represent everybody who is not him, and he joins the Proxy firm for this reason. He is married and abuses his wife regularly, leading to her losing touch with reality and ultimately killing herself.

One of the proxies hired by the proxy firm along with Kanō. It took him three tries to pass the exam required to become an enforcer, done by memorizing the entire book, whereas everybody else got a list with answers on it from various scouts. Initially optimistic, he grows jaded when he realizes the truth behind the enforcements.

A proxy scout for the firm. She knows much more about Kanō than he does, and they are linked through an event that happened years before the beginning of the manga. She is also in charge of securing contracts and gathers the paperwork needed to satisfy the association. Higuchi claims to be able to predict Kanō's every decision.

Media

Manga
Freesia, written and illustrated by Jiro Matsumoto, was serialized in Shogakukan's Spirits Zōkan Ikki (later Monthly Ikki) from September 29, 2001 to August 25, 2009. Shogakukan collected its chapters in twelve tankōbon volumes, released from July 30, 2003 to November 30, 2009.

It has been licensed in Italia by RW Edizioni and in Spain by Editorial Ivrea.

Volume list

Film
A live-action film based on the manga was released on February 3, 2007. It was directed by Kazuyoshi Kumakiri, written by Takashi Ujita, and starred Tetsuji Tamayama as Hiroshi.

Reception

Freesia is Matsumoto's internationally best known work and although not officially translated into English it has been popular on the scanlation circuit.

Ryan Payton of 1UP.com described it as having "awesome art, intense stakeouts and firefights, and lots of psychoanalysis." Gavin J. Blair wrote for The Hollywood Reporter that it has elements that would attract a Hollywood adaptation and compared it to Purge.

The film adaptation received a four out five rating from The Japan Timess Mark Schilling.

References

External links
 
 
 

Action anime and manga
Psychological thriller anime and manga
Seinen manga
Shogakukan manga
Japanese psychological thriller films
Japanese action films